The Karachi Naval Dockyard, also refers as PN Dockyard, is a naval base located adjacent to the commercial Karachi Shipyard and the PNS Qasim. It is also the only submarine construction base for the Pakistan Navy.

Footnotes

External links

Pakistan Navy submarine bases
Shipyards of Pakistan
Military installations in Karachi